The fourth season of Reign, an American historical fantasy, premiered on February 10, 2017.  The series, created by Stephanie SenGupta and Laurie McCarthy, airs on The CW. On December 7, 2016 the CW announced that this would be the final season and would consist of 16 episodes.

Season overview
The season has Queen Mary Stuart returned to Scotland and trying to regain power in her torn homeland. She has to manage her allies, such as her bastard half-brother James and the outspoken Lord Bothwell, as well as her enemies, such as the Protestant preacher John Knox. Tensions mount between Queen Mary and Queen Elizabeth, with Queen Mary marrying her distant cousin Lord Darnley, an English Catholic claimant to the English throne, in the hopes of taking England. In France, Queen Mother Catherine has to protect her second son, King Charles IX, from the ambitions of her daughter Queen Leeza of Spain and her youngest son, Prince Henry from inciting further wars.

Cast and characters

Main
 Adelaide Kane as Mary, Queen of Scots
 Toby Regbo as Francis II of France
 Megan Follows as Catherine de' Medici
 Rachel Skarsten as Queen Elizabeth I of England
 Celina Sinden as Greer
 Craig Parker as Stephan Narcisse 
 Rose Williams as Princess Claude of France
 Jonathan Keltz as Leith Bayard
 Ben Geurens as Gideon Blackburn 
 Dan Jeannotte as James Stewart, Lord Moray
 Jonathan Goad as John Knox
 Spencer MacPherson as King Charles IX of France 
 Will Kemp as Henry Stuart, Lord Darnley

Recurring
 Anastasia Phillips as Queen Leeza of Spain
 Nola Augustson as Lady Lennox
 Claire Hunter as Emily Knox
 Steve Lund as Luc Narcisse
 Sara Garcia as Keira
 Philip Riccio as Ambassador Richards
 Adam Croasdell as Lord Bothwell
 Andrew Shaver as David Rizzio
 Ann Pirvu as Nicole
 Nick Slater as Prince Henry of Valois
 Steve Byers as Archduke Ferdinand of Austria
 Megan Hutchings as Jane 
 John Ralston as Lord Ruthven

Guest
 Mark Ghanimé as Don Carlos of Spain 
 Lewis Kirk as Martel de Guise
 Chad Connell as Lord Taylor
 Max Lloyd-Jones as John Hawkins
 James Gilbert as Lord Barrett
 Tyrone Savage as Lord Hamilton
 Richard Fleeshman as Francis Drake
 Rebecca Liddiard as Margot of France
 Jake Foy as James VI of Scotland

Notes

Episodes

Ratings

References

2017 American television seasons